Amber Smith is the fifth studio album recorded by Amber Smith. The album was released on 21 February 2012 by the German Kalinkaland Records. This was the first record with guitarist Gergő Szabados and keyboardist Zalán Póka.

Track listing
"Unanswered
"Square 1
"Bourbon and Soda
"Faster Than the Speed of Light
"Ise
"If I Had A Reason
"Your Life Is My Death
"Cinnamon In My Pocket
"Hong Kong Falls

Personnel
The following people contributed to Amber Smith:

Amber Smith
 Oszkár Ács - bass
 Bence Bátor - drums
 Zalán Póka - keyboards
 Imre Poniklo - vocals and guitars
 Gergely Szabados - additional guitars

Additional musicians and production
 Gábor Cserkész - erhu (5)
 Sándor Dániel - recording
 György Ligeti - mixing 
 Enikő Hodosi – vocals (4)
 Eszter Polyák - recording and backing vocals (7)(9)
 George Shilling - mixing (2)
 Dávid Vesztergombi - strings

References

External links
 Amber Smith at Kalinkaland's webpage
 Amber Smith at Amber Smith's webpage

2012 albums
Amber Smith (band) albums